The SST family is a series of German torpedoes.

SST-3 Seal
The SST-3 entered into service in the 1960s.

SST-4 Seal
The SST-4 entered into service in the late 1970s. The SST-4 is nearly identical to the SST-3 with the addition of passive homing.

Guidance: The Torpedo was wire guided, but the guidance system only allowed for limited interaction between submarine and torpedo. It featured active and passive homing and could be launched from up to 100 meters deep. Seeker was designed only for surface ships, being superior to original SUT torpedoes at that role, but lacking the ASW capabilities

Range and Speed: Originally featured 2 speed presets, a slower 23 knots speed with a range of 37 kilometers, and a fast 37 knots speed with a range of around 11 kilometers.

Detonator and Warhead: Mod 0 featured an impact fuze, but mod1 also added magnetic fuze, since test showed that seekers winding path could make the torpedo hit target at a sharp angle preventing the contact detonation. Warhead was 260 kg of explosive.

Service history 
The SST-4 was employed by the Argentine Navy during the Falklands War. with poor results. The only Argentine operational Type 209 submarine, ARA San Luis (S-32) fired three torpedoes with no hits after all of them failed to work properly. Investigations conducted by Argentine Navy after the conflict came to the results that there was a problem in the seekers who were assembled wrong, and with the support of the manufacturer fixed the entire navy SST-4 supply in the next years, further upgrading them by the addition of magnetic fuze, performing a successful live test in which the newly commissioned ARA Santa Cruz (S-41) sunk the decommissioned destroyer ARA Py (D-27) on June 15, 1987.

In 2018 the Turkish navy destroyed a target ship with a SST-4 Mod 0 fired from the TCG Yildiray.

In 2020 the Hellenic Navy destroyed a target ship with a SST-4, fired from the Υ/Β ΠΙΠΙΝΟΣ 214 HN (S121).

Users 
Argentine Navy
Hellenic Navy
Turkish Navy

See also 
SUT torpedo

References 

Torpedoes of Germany